Río Tercero Airport is a public use airport  east of Río Tercero, a city in the Córdoba Province of Argentina.

See also

Transport in Argentina
List of airports in Argentina

References

External links 
OpenStreetMap - Río Tercero
OurAirports - Río Tercero Airport

Airports in Argentina
Córdoba Province, Argentina